John Struan Robertson  (born 6 December 1951 in Auckland) is a former New Zealand politician and later a New Zealand government-appointed Commissioner (2013).

Member of Parliament

Robertson was an MP from 1990 to 1996, representing first the National Party and then United New Zealand. He was first elected to Parliament in the 1990 general election as MP for Papakura, replacing Merv Wellington. He was re-elected in the 1993 general election.

In 1995, he was one of seven centrist MPs who established United New Zealand. Robertson's Papakura electorate was disestablished before the 1996 election; he stood instead for  where he finished second to National's Warren Kyd. United New Zealand did not poll high enough to be entitled to any list MPs, so Robertson left Parliament.

Local government career

Mayor of Papakura
Robertson was later elected Mayor of Papakura and served from 2004 to 2007.

Kaipara District Council Commission
In August 2012, the elected councillors of Kaipara District Council were replaced with a four-member commission as a result of serious governance and financial failures. Robertson was appointed as the chair of the commission. While Local Government Minister David Carter initially said that this commission was expected to remain until October 2015, it was not removed until October 2016.

Mayor of Waitomo 
Robertson contested and won the Waitomo district mayoralty in the 2019 local elections, defeating incumbent Brian Hanna.

Honours
In the 2008 Queen's Birthday Honours, Robertson was appointed a Companion of the Queen's Service Order for public services and services to local body affairs.

References

1951 births
Living people
Mayors of Papakura
New Zealand National Party MPs
United New Zealand MPs
Members of the New Zealand House of Representatives
New Zealand MPs for Auckland electorates
Companions of the Queen's Service Order
Unsuccessful candidates in the 1996 New Zealand general election